Bridgit Claire Mendler (born December 18, 1992) is an American actress and singer. She starred in the films Alice Upside Down (2007), The Clique (2008), Labor Pains (2009) and Lemonade Mouth (2011). In 2009, Mendler signed with Disney Channel and played Juliet van Heusen on Wizards of Waverly Place. Following the positive reception to her character, she landed the role of Teddy Duncan on the Disney series Good Luck Charlie, which ran from April 2010 to February 2014. Subsequently, Mendler portrayed Candace in the NBC sitcom Undateable (2015–2016) and Ashley Willerman in the musical television series Merry Happy Whatever (2019). As a singer, Mendler released her debut studio album Hello My Name Is... (2012), with the hit single "Ready or Not", and a EP Nemesis (2016). She is the recipient of various accolades, including a Radio Disney Music Award, and nominations for a Young Artist Award, eight World Music Awards, and three Shorty Awards.

Mendler has links with several philanthropic projects and humanitarian causes. From 2010 to 2012, she served as ambassador to First Book, a campaign to encourage reading and gives books to children in need, and Give with Target, with Target Corporation to raise funds to reform schools in the United States. Since 2017, she has been a student and researcher with the MIT Media Lab. As of 2022, she is working on her Ph.D at Harvard Law School and at MIT's Center for Constructive Communications and Social Machines group.

Early life 
Mendler was born in Washington, D.C. She is the daughter of Sandra Ford-Mendler and Charles Mendler, and has a younger brother named Nicholas. She moved with her family to Mill Valley, California, at the age of eight. It was there where she first expressed interest in acting and began working in plays. When she was eight years old, Mendler began taking part in local roles in both dramatic and musical theatre, and became the youngest performer in the San Francisco Fringe Festival. When she was 11 years old, she hired an agent to help her get acting jobs. Mendler is the niece of psychologist Christine Blasey Ford.

Career

2004–2008: Career beginnings 

In 2004, Mendler got her first acting role in the animated Indian film The Legend of Buddha, in which she portrayed Lucy. When she was 13 years old, she got an acting role as a guest star on the soap opera General Hospital. She portrayed the dream child of character Lulu Spencer, in which the two have an argument on Mendler's character's birthday. The scene, lasting just under a minute, is later revealed to be a dream. That same year, Mendler was the voice of the character Thorn in the video game Bone: The Great Cow Race, which was based on the Bone comic series. In 2007, Mendler made her film debut in the film adaption of the Alice series, titled Alice Upside Down. Mendler starred alongside Disney Channel actress Alyson Stoner and Lucas Grabeel. Mendler portrayed the antagonistic role of Pamela, who is the rival of Stoner's character, Alice. For the film's soundtrack, Mendler provided backing vocals on the song "Free Spirit", performed by Stoner. Also in 2007 Mendler auditioned for Sonny with a Chance for the role of Sonny Munroe, but Demi Lovato was chosen. In 2008, it was announced that Mendler would play the role of Kristen Gregory in the film adaption of the popular teen novel series The Clique by Lisi Harrison. Mendler had the role of Kristen, a girl who attends OCD on a scholarship, and works hard to keep her good grades.

She also had begun working on a film with actress and singer Lindsay Lohan titled Labor Pains, which kept being pushed back due to various conflicts and problems. Though initially slated for a theatrical release, the film did not receive one in the US and was instead released as a TV film on ABC Family in 2009. The film did, however, receive a theatrical release in countries such as Russia, Romania, Spain, the United Arab Emirates, Ecuador, and Mexico. The film drew 2.1 million viewers, a better-than-average prime-time audience for ABC Family, and per the network, was the week's top cable film among coveted female demographic groups. She had a supporting role in the film Alvin and the Chipmunks: The Squeakquel.

2009–2012: Breakthrough with Disney 

In 2009, Mendler became a recurring character in the Disney Channel series Wizards of Waverly Place. Mendler portrayed the role of Juliet Van Heusen, a vampire who later forms a romance with David Henrie's character Justin Russo. This lasts till the series finale. Mendler would go on to appear in eleven episodes total for the series, spanning from 2009 to 2012 when the series ended. In 2010, Mendler became the star of the Disney Channel Original Series Good Luck Charlie, centering on a teenage girl who makes videos for her baby sister to watch as she gets older. The series premiered on April 4, 2010, and was met with a positive critical reception and viewership. In the third season, Disney Channel announced that the series would feature a same-sex couple. This decision caused a protest from the conservative group "One Million Moms" asking Disney Channel not to air the episode. One of Disney's spokespersons told TV Guide the episode was "developed to be relevant to kids and families around the world and to reflect themes of diversity and inclusiveness." Disney aired the episode as planned. Other people including actors Miley Cyrus and Evan Rachel Wood expressed their support.

In 2011, she starred as Olivia White, the lead role in the Disney Channel Original Movie Lemonade Mouth, watched by 5.7 million viewers on its premiere night. Mendler performed numerous songs for the film's soundtrack, which was released on April 12, 2011 by Walt Disney Records. The first single released from the soundtrack, titled "Somebody", was released on March 4, and peaked at number 89 on the US Billboard Hot 100 chart. The second single, "Determinate", charted in numerous other countries and peaked at number 51 on the Billboard Hot 100. In an interview with Kidzworld Media, Mendler confirmed that there will not be a sequel to Lemonade Mouth, commenting: "There’s not [going to be a sequel to Lemonade Mouth] unfortunately. We had such a great experience working on the movie, and they tried to figure something out for a sequel, but everyone at Disney felt like the movie had completed its story in the first movie. It was a great experience, and I loved working with the cast members and still see them frequently." In 2011, Mendler had the supporting role of Appoline in the straight to DVD film Beverly Hills Chihuahua 2. Mendler recorded the song "This Is My Paradise" for the film, which was released as a promotional single on January 11, 2011, with a music video directed by Alex Zamm.

On March 31, 2011, it was confirmed that Mendler had signed with Hollywood Records, and had begun working on her debut album. Also in 2011 Mendler also starred the Disney Channel Original Movie Good Luck Charlie, It's Christmas!, which premiered on December 2, 2011. The song "I'm Gonna Run to You" was co-written and performed by Mendler, and was also featured in the film and released as promotional single on November 12, 2011. Mendler later co-wrote and sang the Disney's Friends for Change Games anthem called "We Can Change the World", released as her third promotional single on June 11, 2011. In 2012, she guest-starred in the television series House as Callie Rogers, a homeless runaway teenager with a mysterious illness. She voiced the lead role of Arrietty in the American English dub of The Secret World of Arrietty, and she recorded a song, "Summertime," for the movie, which was released as a promotional single on February 2.

2012–2015: Musical debut, Hello My Name Is..., and Undateable 

In Summer 2012, Mendler confirmed that the title of her official debut single was "Ready or Not", written by Mendler herself, Emanuel "Eman" Kiriakou and Evan "Kidd" Bogart. The song was released for digital download on August 7 and for radio airplay on August 21, 2012. "Ready or Not" peaked at 49 in the United States and 53 in Australia, but at number seven in the United Kingdom and within the top twenty of the charts in Belgium, the Republic of Ireland and New Zealand. The song received platinum certification in the United States and Canada and Gold in Denmark, New Zealand and Norway. Mendler ventured on her first headlining tour, Bridgit Mendler: Live in Concert, supporting her first studio album. The tour primarily reached only North America and she played at state fairs, music festivals and Jingle Ball's concerts series. Mendler's debut album, Hello My Name Is..., was released on October 22 by Hollywood Records and all the songs were written by Mendler with collaborators, included 12 tracks in standard version and 15 in deluxe edition. Mendler was also involved in its production. The album peaked at number 30 on the Billboard 200 and sold less than 200,000 copies in the country.

Internationally "Hello My Name Is .." debuted in a few countries including Poland, Australia, United Kingdom, France and Spain. Mendler's vocals have been compared to Lily Allen, Cher Lloyd, Jessie J and Karmin. She released two promotional singles on the album: "Forgot to Laugh" and "Top of the World". On February 12, 2013, her second single, "Hurricane", was released for radio airplay. The song peaked at number 1 on the Billboard Bubbling Under Hot 100 in the United States. On April 2 Mendler released a remix single version and, on June 21, an EP remixed. Also in June Mendler debuted her second tour, the Summer Tour, reaching only the United States. On April 30 she released the extended play Live in London, by Universal Music, recorded at a special performance in the United Kingdom. It  on Mendler's VEVO On November 16, 2013 was premiered the music video for acoustic version of "Top of the World", directed by Matt Wyatt.  She recorded it on her own, independent of Hollywood Records, and filmed in Griffith Park, in Los Angeles.

On June 28, 2014, Mendler began the second leg of her Summer Tour, in Charlottetown, Prince Edward Island, Canada. On that date, she sang one of her new songs, "Fly to You", about a relationship that was said to be on the rocks but worth fighting for. On July 5, she performed another new song, "Deeper Shade Of Us", with disco influences. On November 25, 2014, Mendler was announced as a member of the main cast of the NBC comedy series Undateable in season two. She portrays the character Candace, an unlucky and undefeatably optimistic waitress, who becomes part of the main group. During the season, Candace and Justin, played by Brent Morin, were dating. After initial reports, it was confirmed on July 2, 2015, that Mendler left Hollywood Records earlier in the year. 

In early 2015, NBC renewed with Mendler for a third season that consisted entirely of live episodes, which premiered October 15 of that year. In the season Justin proposes to Candace during a Backstreet Boys show and she accepts. On November 13, 2015, minutes before air time, a decision was made to pre-empt the then-upcoming live program due to the November 2015 Paris attacks. The next week, the live episode references were made about the attack as a tribute. Following the third season, it was announced that NBC had cancelled continuation of the series.

2016–present: Nemesis, Nashville, and Merry Happy Whatever 
In 2016, Mendler began working on new music. Mendler discussed some of the producers and songwriters she was working with, including Mitch Allan, Dan Book, Alexei Misoul, Augie Ray, Beloryze, TMS, Ina Wroldsen, and Steve Mac. On August 4, 2016, Mendler announced the title of her new single, "Atlantis", featuring Kaiydo, which was released on August 26, 2016. The EP, Nemesis, was released on November 18. In October 2016, Mendler was cast as Ashley Willerman on the fifth season of the CMT television series Nashville.
 On February 3, 2017, Mendler announced her new single, "Temperamental Love" featuring Devontée. The music video was featured the YouTuber Jam in The Van. On February 10, Mendler was cast in lead role of the Fox comedy television pilot Thin Ice, created by Elizabeth Meriwether, but the network ultimately passed on the pilot in May. On August 25, 2017, Mendler released a single titled "Diving" with American group RKCB. The official music video was released hours after the release of the song. She appeared in the Netflix comedy film Father of the Year along with David Spade, Joey Bragg, Matt Shively and Jackie Sandler, which was released July 20, 2018. In November 2019, Mendler appeared in the eight-part Netflix comedy television series, Merry Happy Whatever, along with Dennis Quaid, Ashley Tisdale, and her Undateable co-star Brent Morin.

Other ventures

Philanthropy 

In 2010, Mendler became ambassador to First Book, a campaign to encourage reading and gives books to children in need. In 2011 it became part of Disney's Friends for Change, a pro-social "green" initiative of charity for environmental issues encouraging fans to take action. As campaign theme that year Mendler released a promotional single on June 11, "We Can Change the World", raising $250,000 for the Disney Worldwide Conservation Fund. She also participated of the Disney's Friends for Change Games, an Olympic-based televised games aired on the Disney Channel, getting $125,000 donation to UNICEF as Yellow Team captain and also competing for $100,000. But her team lost to the World Wide Fund for Nature. In 2012 Mendler won the honorary award Common Sense Media as Role Model of the Year for her work against bullying. Mendler was the third young artist to win the award, which usually honors environmentalists and scholars. She also attended the annual UNICEF acoustic concert in New York to raise donations for charity in January 2013. In July 2012 Mendler became ambassador of the campaign Give With Target with Target Corporation to raise funds to reform schools in the United States. The campaign aims to get $1 billion by 2015. To start the Target campaign, they invested $5 million and distributed $25,000 grants to 100 in-need schools for the school year. Mendler said about the incentive: “I’m excited to partner with Target on their Give With Target campaign and celebrate the start of a new school year with kids across the country. It's so important for all kids to have everything they need for a successful school year”. In August she got $5 million donated by The Walt Disney Company and more $2 million donated by people at Facebook.

She was featured in a March 2013 public campaign Delete Digital Drama with the Seventeen Magazine to end cyberbullying. About the campaign she said "Being bullied is something I experienced in school and it is not fun...I love working to end cyberbullying. People don't have to push back as much as they would in real life. People need to realize bullying has just as much of an impact online because words are so cutting and difficult to deal with". She also worked with Acuvue being a mentor to help Katie, a winner of the 2013 Acuvue 1-Day Contest, get closer to her dream of making a difference. On October 8 Mendler hosted the event We Day of Free The Children Foundation, a campaign that helps build schools for underprivileged children of Canadian and American cities. Also for Free The Children Foundation she was godmother of We Create a Change to help needy children. 

On November 16, 2013, Mendler participated of the World Challenge Marathon for Save the Children Foundation, a charity race to helps children with health problems. In March 2014, Mendler traveled to region of El Quiché, Guatemala to participate in the other project of Save the Children that helps underprivileged children in developing countries. On April 8, she released the Baby Sit In, that asks for teens to help give parents a break and give babies a healthy start to their life. Mendler said "It’s an easy way for kids to help little ones everywhere get a healthy start and an opportunity to learn just by doing something they do most weekends anyway". Mendler represented the institution during the charity congress Save the Children's annual Advocacy Summit in Washington, D.C. Carolyn Miles, the Save the Children's president, thanked Mendler publicly for humanitarian work: "We are thrilled to have Bridgit on board. Her passion for helping children truly came through when she met with families and kids during her visits to the remote communities in the deserts of California and Guatemala's western highlands".

Image and endorsements 
Mendler was included on Billboard's "21 Under 21: Music's Hottest Minors" list in 2012. In 2013 she also appeared in the list of thirteen. She was also chosen as one of the ten hottest young female artists by Forbes Woman. In 2012, Mendler was chosen as role model of the year by Common Sense Media, a non-profit organization that honors innovative minds from the worlds of entertainment, public policy and technology and rewards mainly teachers, scientists and philanthropists. She was honored for her charity work in anti-bullying actions, improving the lives of families by providing a trustworthy role model and creating a positive impact in the world. Mendler was the second youngest artist to win the award, after Miranda Cosgrove.

In 2012, Mendler signed with Target Corporation to release an exclusive line of clothing inspired by her character Teddy Duncan of Good Luck Charlie. The D-Signed by Teddy Duncan fashion collection includes clothing, accessories, hats, scarves, and souvenirs for girls in range from 4 to 18 years old. In March 2013, a Spring edition was also released. While promoting her debut single "Ready or Not", Mendler signed with The Hunt, a mobile app which combines clothes and shows fashion tendencies. She released exclusively her music video and registered some personal clothes and fashion searches. She also had her own version in the games FanFUN FANfinity. While promoting her debut album Hello My Name Is..., Mendler offered exclusive album promotions through Target. In 2014 she signed with the line of dermatology products Clean & Clear and recorded several commercials and campaigns for real beauty.

Personal life

Relationships 

On March 27, 2012, Shane Harper said in an interview with Officially the Hottest that he was dating Mendler. Harper told the interviewer that they became friends early in Good Luck Charlie and began dating in May 2011. In an interview with Cambio in September 2012, Mendler stated that it took two years between her meeting Harper and beginning to date him. To Classicalite, Mendler talked about dating Harper, and said it took time for them to begin something, because she needed time to think. She said, "We knew each other for a while, were friends for a long time. I think everybody was very respectful about it and wanted to make sure that it wouldn't be weird." In November 2015, Mendler revealed that she had ended her relationship with Harper.

In October 2019, Mendler announced via Instagram that she had married her long-term boyfriend Griffin Cleverly.

Education 
Mendler has a degree in anthropology from the University of Southern California (USC) in Los Angeles, California. Two members of her band also studied at USC. In an interview with Brian Mansfield of USA Today, Mendler said: "My plan right now is just to do one class at a time and see how that goes. I'm just going to study something that will be interesting and doable from the road and just take care of my general education courses for now. I want to know something outside of what I do." In 2013, she chose anthropology and studied Medieval Visual Culture, and medical Anthropology. To the University Star, Mendler said USC was important: "I think seeing that college life and what that would've been like, it does make you wonder what sort of lifestyle that would be, but I'm really grateful for what I have, and I think it's cool that, because my career path is not as formulaic, I can kind of decide when I want to take time off to do certain things." Her mother was pursuing a doctorate in public policy at USC at the time. In 2016 she graduated as an anthropologist.

In May 2017, Mendler was announced as one of the 2017 MIT Media Lab's Director's Fellows. In May 2018, she announced on Twitter that she started a graduate program at the Massachusetts Institute of Technology (MIT) with a focus on improving social media: "As an entertainer, for years I struggled with social media because I felt like there was a more loving and human way to connect with fans." In January 2019, Mendler indicated that she was enrolled in a class at Harvard Law School. In 2020, she completed her graduate degree at MIT and began working on her Ph.D with MIT's Center for Constructive Communications and Social Machines group. As of 2022, she is concurrently enrolled at Harvard Law School, where she is a 2L, and at MIT.

Artistry

Influences 
Mendler has cited Bob Dylan as her biggest musical influence. To Ed Condran of Hartford Courant she said that: "You look at what Bob Dylan and artists like him have done and you just can't help but be blown away. I'm just glad I have the opportunity to start with this and I just want to take it as far as I can". In an interview with Disney Channel Netherlands, she revealed that her favorite song was "Don't Think Twice, It's All Right" from Dylan's 1963 album The Freewheelin' Bob Dylan. To Taylor Trudon of Huffington Post she said: "He was the first musician I got into where I paid attention to songwriting. He has a way of writing songs that's really playful with lyrics, but at the same time he's saying something that people feel is important and that they relate to. He spoke for a whole generation.". Also to Trudon, Mendler cited Etta James, Elvis Presley, B. B. King, Lily Allen, Ella Fitzgerald and Billie Holiday, and talked about these artists: "I love that they have soul in their voices. I think that's something important". Other musical influences include Elvis Costello, The Delfonics, Red Hot Chili Peppers and Van Morrison. During an interview with Yahoo!, in 2012, Mendler also commented that her first female influence was the R&B girl group Salt-N-Pepa and sang an impromptu a cappella rendition of the song "Shoop".

She said hip hop band Fugees had great influence in her music training and also the recording of the debut album and song "Ready or Not", "One of the writers was like ‘Check out this Fugees song, ‘Ready or Not’. So we all listened to it and were like that would be kind of fun to do some sort of interpolation off of that song, which is what we did. I think it stands by itself as its own song but it still has that memorable quality of the Fugees song, which is fun. I think we were all really proud of it and hoping it will go far". For her debut album, Hello My Name Is..., Mendler was inspired by indie pop singers Ingrid Michaelson and Feist. Among the pop music artists, she cited Maroon 5, No Doubt, Destiny's Child, Justin Timberlake, Beyoncé and Bruno Mars.  She cited Jamie Foxx as a great model of how to have a career in acting and music.

Mendler said that is influenced by British neo-soul and listed Ellie Goulding, Florence and the Machine, Marina Diamandis, and Lianne La Havas as her biggest British influences. She has mentioned Natasha Bedingfield, Broken Bells, Mark Ronson and Amy Winehouse. In 2013 Mendler revealed to have a big admiration for the Adele's musical style. To Disney Channel UK she said that "admire the career of Adele, because she has her own musical style. She does things her way and writes about things she is passionate about. It is really working out well for her". She was also influenced by Canadian artists Feist and Tegan and Sara. To Hartford Courant she commented: "I've been a fan of Tegan and Sara's for awhile. They just do what they want to do. They don't follow trends". She covered the song "I Was a Fool" by the duo and released with the message: "I heard this song by Tegan and Sara a couple weeks ago and couldn't stop singing it, so I just had to do my own version". In 2014, she mentioned in an interview to CKQK-FM Canadian artists Nelly Furtado, Joni Mitchell and European bands Coldplay and Little Dragon as influences in composing her second album.

In acting career, Mendler has cited some influences as Jamie Foxx, Natalie Portman and Rachel McAdams. About McAdams she said that "She plays a variety of roles, she has a lot of charisma, and she doesn’t try to live her life in the public eye". She also admires the dedication of Christian Bale: "I could not live my life as committed to the craft as he does, with body transformations and such, he goes to such extremes but he is very admirable". Mendler also mentioned Lindsay Lohan as a great actress.

Lyrical themes and songwriting 

Thematically, Guilherme Tintel of Portal It Pop has noted that Mendler wasn't immature as the first work of other Hollywood artists. Tintel compares her songs to Jessie J, Katy Perry, Natalia Kills and Taylor Swift. Mendler said that the writing process isn't hard, because she was influenced by her own experiences. Her debut single, "Ready or Not", talks about self-confidence and deal with boys. To Pop Dirt Mendler said: "I consider myself to be that girl sitting at the curb waiting for the world, so I think it’s a great message to send to just go for the things that you want to take charge of". Her debut album discussed relationships ("Rocks at My Window", "Top of the World", "Love Will Tell Us Where to Go", "The Fall Song" and "Hold On for Dear Love"), break-up ("5:15"), alienation and romantic chaos ("Hurricane" and "Forgot to Laugh"), self-confidence ("Ready or Not"), self-esteem ("City Lights"), friendship ("We're Dancing"), money ("All I See Is Gold") and blonde girls ("Blonde").

To Hartford Courant she commented that writing is a compulsion. "It's also something I really enjoy. I like to create. It's part of being a recording artist. I love to write songs". Mendler also said she didn't want to make commercial songs, but timeless songs. "I want to make music that stands the test of time. You look at what Bob Dylan and artists like him have done and you just can't help but be blown away. I'm just glad I have the opportunity to start with this and I just want to take it as far as I can. I wanted variety and to just make things really interesting. This isn't just something that comes out of a machine. It came out of me. This isn't about product. I want to grow as an artist. I remember listening to certain recording artists and songs that had a really big impact on me".

Musical and voice style 
Mendler's vocal range spans 3.4 octaves. She is a mezzo-soprano. She plays guitar, keyboard, and keytar Sávio Alves of Febre Teen Magazine said that Mendler's voice was "strong and sweet". He calls Mendler's voice as having a "metallic tone" and this being "rare in young female singers". Her voice was compared to indie and blues artists. Her music is generally pop and reggae fusion and has features of R&B, funk, and hip hop soul. In an interview, she said she prefers to escape the traditional pop and dance-pop and adding other elements. "I have funky, R&B tendencies when I write by myself. I really love doo-wop and a jazzy swing beat. Rhythm is a big emphasis in my own writing". Her voice and style has been compared to Lily Allen. She has been compared to Miley Cyrus, who also started on the Disney Channel, but in an interview to Christian Post Mendler said: "I'm not Miley Cyrus. There may be some similarities but I'm my own person." In 2013, during an interview with the Huffington Post, Mendler was compared to other young artists and asked if she would follow the footsteps in pop music. Mendler said that "They've done so much and they're so talented. I think it's tricky because they've been obviously very successful, but I think you always want to be your own person and not be categorized by doing the same thing".

Filmography

Film

Television

Video games 
 Bone: The Great Cow Race (2006), as Thorn (voice role)

Discography 

Studio albums
 Hello My Name Is... (2012)

Extended plays
 Live in London (2013)
 Nemesis (2016)

Concert tours 

 Live in Concert (2012)
 Summer Tour (2013–2014)
 Nemesis Tour (2016–2017)

Awards and nominations

References

External links 

 

 
1992 births
21st-century American actresses
21st-century American singers
21st-century American women singers
Actresses from Washington, D.C.
American child actresses
American child singers
American women pop singers
American sopranos
American television actresses
American voice actresses
Hollywood Records artists
Living people
Singers from Washington, D.C.
Singers with a three-octave vocal range
Songwriters from Washington, D.C.
University of Southern California alumni
Walt Disney Records artists
Massachusetts Institute of Technology fellows